Farmer Boys is a fast casual chain that operates primarily in California. Its headquarters are located in Riverside, California.

History 
Farmer Boys was founded by the Havadjias brothers in 1981. The Havadjias family were immigrants from Cyprus. The brothers originally owned Astro Burgers in Torrance, California in 1979 and Theodore's Restaurant in Hollywood, California in 1981 prior to owning McCoy's Restaurant in Perris, California. McCoy's Restaurant became the first Farmer Boys restaurant following the name change in August 1981. About 16 years later, Farmer Boys had grown to eight restaurants. A year later, Farmer Boys was granted franchise status and later in the year, a Farmer Boys restaurant opened in Temecula, California. 

As of 2022,  there were more than 100 Farmer Boys restaurants in Arizona, California and Nevada.

In February 2020, Farmer Boys temporarily changed its name to "Farmer Girls" to celebrate Women's History Month and International Women's Day.  They gave their bacon burger a new name: "Bacon Girl." The name change was also to honor the chain's 1,600 plus female staff members who help run the business.

In mid-March 2020, as a result of the COVID-19 pandemic Farmer Boys temporarily shut down its dining room.  Drive-thru, delivery, takeout and pick up service were offered.

In 2021, Farmer Boys expanded into Arizona, the restaurant's third state of operation after California and Nevada. Gilbert, Arizona was the first location.

In 2022, Farmer Boys promted Joseph Oritz to president and chief executive operator.

See also 
 List of hamburger restaurants

References

External links 

 Farmer Boys

Fast-food chains of the United States
Fast-food franchises
Fast-food hamburger restaurants
Regional restaurant chains in the United States
Companies based in Riverside, California
Restaurants established in 1981
Restaurants in Riverside County, California
1981 establishments in California